Meryl Glynis Fernandes (born 1983) is an English actress and presenter. She played Afia Masood, a love interest for Tamwar Masood (Himesh Patel) in the BBC soap opera EastEnders, originally making a guest appearance between 29 December 2009 and 5 January 2010. She returned to the role of Afia, on 18 November 2010, this time as a regular character. She departed EastEnders on 7 June 2012.

Personal life
Born in 1983 to Harold and Ghislaine Fernandes, Meryl was brought up in London and went to Trinity Catholic High School, Woodford Green. Her parents, of Goan Indian ancestry, were originally from Nairobi. Fernandes trained at Millennium Performing Arts in 2000. She is skilled in several types of dance and has kissed Tom Hardy in a play.

Career
Other than appearing in EastEnders, Fernandes has appeared Doctor Who, Demons, Minder alongside fellow EastEnders actor, Shane Richie, It's Now or Never, Clone and Dis/Connected. She has also appeared in the highly criticised YouTube series, Living With the Infidels playing 'Jot'. In stage she has appeared in The Lion of Punjab in 2006 and A Small Town Anywhere directed in 2007. In musicals she has appeared in Oliver! as a 'Workhouse Girl', in 1996 and sung in Il mondo della luna at the Royal Academy of Music in 2003. She has also appeared in a film, Ashes where she appeared as the lead role, Amisha, in 2012.

Filmography
Television

Film

Theatre

References

External links
 
 

1983 births
Living people
Actresses from London
People from the London Borough of Tower Hamlets
British actresses of Indian descent
British people of Goan descent
English television actresses
English stage actresses
English soap opera actresses
English film actresses
21st-century English actresses